Moorefield Historic District is a national historic district located at Moorefield, Hardy County, West Virginia.  The district encompasses 171 contributing buildings. It consists of a mix of commercial, residential and civic structures, ranging in age from
the mid 18th century to the early 20th century. Predominate residential styles are Greek Revival and Queen Anne.  The commercial buildings are Italianate style. Notable buildings include the Hardy County Court House (1914), City
Hall, and Emmanuel Episcopal Church (1879).  Located in the district are the separately listed Old Stone Tavern, Thomas Maslin House, and Old Hardy County Courthouse.

It was listed on the National Register of Historic Places in 1986.

References

External links

Historic districts in Hardy County, West Virginia
Houses on the National Register of Historic Places in West Virginia
Commercial buildings on the National Register of Historic Places in West Virginia
Greek Revival architecture in West Virginia
Italianate architecture in West Virginia
Queen Anne architecture in West Virginia
Houses in Hardy County, West Virginia
National Register of Historic Places in Hardy County, West Virginia
Historic districts on the National Register of Historic Places in West Virginia